Eric Dusingizimana (born 21 March 1987) is a Rwandan cricketer and civil engineer who also captained the Rwanda national cricket team. He is also a Guinness World Record holder in cricket which he set in 2016 for a social cause. He was well known for his marathon batting effort in 2016 where he batted for 51 hours non-stop in order to set a Guinness World Record. He decided to bat for such long time in order to raise funds for the construction of Gahanga International Cricket Stadium.

Early life 
He was born in a family of six siblings. He witnessed the 1994 Rwandan genocide as a six-year-old boy. He along with his family members managed to survive from the genocide which killed more than 600,000 people in Rwanda. He began playing cricket at the age of 18 in 2006 when he was studying in the high school. He idolised MS Dhoni and AB de Villiers during his young age when he started playing the sport of cricket. He pursued interest in the sport of cricket due to the close interrelationship cricket had with the subject combination which he selected for his studies.

Domestic career 
Dusingizimana started playing cricket for Right Guards team in 2006. He won the fifty-overs Premier League while playing for Right Guards. He later played for Young Tigers, Impala Titans and Dugout CC. He won the Player of the Tournament Award in the one-day format while playing for Impala Titans in 2010. He also guided the team to the 20-overs title in the same year. He rejoined Right Guards in 2014 and also captained the team.

In 2015, he scored a 60-ball hundred for Right Guards against Indorwa at Computer Point 20-over tournament.

International career 
He pursued his higher studies at his university in the field of civil engineering. He also graduated in architecture technology. He was selected to the national team in 2008 for the 2008 ICC World Cricket League Africa Region Division Three tournament. He represented Rwanda Under-19s in the 2010 Africa Under-19 Championship Division Two. He was appointed as the captain of the national cricket team in 2011. He also attended the meetings of Rwanda selection committee since being appointed as the captain of the team.

In May 2016, he embarked on a unique mission to support the Rwanda Cricket Association in order to build the first cricket stadium in Rwanda. Eric took it as his dream project with a vision of establishing Rwanda's first ever cricket ground. He batted for about 51 hours continuously at Amaharo Stadium in Remera for more than two days indoors which also attracted huge crowd attention and national attention. His attempt was later recognised by the Guinness World Record officials as the world record for the longest individual net session. He began his attempt on 11 May 2016 and was allowed a five-minute break for every hour of his batting session and completed the task on 13 May 2016 at the Amahoro Stadium in Kigali. He also faced throwdowns from the former British Prime Minister Tony Blair who was on an official visit to Rwanda in order to attend the World Economic Forum on Africa. He also faced deliveries from Julienne Uwacu, Mutesi Jolly, Jimmy Mulis, Andrew Mitchell and William Gelling. His wife apparently bowled the last delivery to him. He broke the world record of India's Virag Mare who batted 50 hours during his marathon efforts Mahahalaxmi Lawns at Karve Nagar in Pune. Prior to this effort, the record was held by English players Dave Newman and Richard Wells who batted for 48 hours at a stretch. Following his marathon effort, he was hailed as a national hero in Rwanda. Rwanda Stadium Cricket Foundation, a charity organisation was set up to raise funds to construct the Gahanga International Cricket Stadium. In June 2016, he travelled to England, spent a week in London and managed to raise £120,000. He was accompanied by English cricketer Joe Root who joined his fundraising trip across England.

He also approached the United Nation High Commissioner for Refugees in order to discuss his interest to launch cricket training programs for refugees in Rwanda.

In August 2021, he was named in the Rwandan squad for the home T20I series against Ghana. He made his T20I debut for Rwanda on 18 August 2021, against Ghana, in what was Rwanda's first official T20I.

See also 

 List of Rwanda Twenty20 International cricketers
 Cathia Uwamahoro

References

External links 

 

1987 births
Living people
Rwandan engineers
Rwandan cricketers
Rwanda Twenty20 International cricketers